Nemanja "Neno" Gudelj (born 16 November 1991) is a Serbian professional footballer who plays as a midfielder for La Liga side Sevilla and the Serbia national team. He is the son of former player Nebojša Gudelj and the older brother of Dragiša Gudelj.

Club career

NAC Breda
Gudelj signed his first professional contract with NAC Breda in July 2009 but failed to make an official appearance in his debut season despite being named on the bench several times.

AZ

In the summer of 2013 Gudelj transferred to AZ Alkmaar for a fee of around €3 million, sold by his father who was manager at NAC, signing a four-year contract.

He received interest from Portuguese club Porto.

Ajax
On 6 May 2015, it was announced that Gudelj would join AFC Ajax starting from the 2015–16 season. Along with him, his younger brother Dragiša would move to Ajax youth team and his father Nebojša would become a scout for the club focusing primarily on scouting players from the Balkans and Serbia. On 5 November 2016, Gudelj was removed from the first team selection after stating he couldn't be motivated when not starting.

Tianjin TEDA
On 5 January 2017, Ajax announced Gudelj would transfer to Tianjin TEDA on 25 January 2017 for a sum rumoured to be around €5.5 million.

Guangzhou Evergrande Taobao
On 28 January 2018, Guangzhou Evergrande Taobao announced that Gudelj was transferred from Tianjin TEDA and signed a 2-year contract. The transfer fee was not announced. He made his debut for Guangzhou on 21 February 2018 in a 0–0 away draw against Cerezo Osaka in the second group stage match of 2018 AFC Champions League. On 14 March, he scored his first goal for the club in the fourth group stage match of the AFC Champions League against Jeju United, which ensured Guangzhou Evergrande's 2–0 away win. Gudelj was excluded from first team squad in July 2018 due to the limitation of the number of foreign players.

Sporting CP (loan)
On 23 August 2018, Gudelj was loaned to Primeira Liga side Sporting CP for the 2018–19 season. 
The contract at will extend for four years as a Sporting CP player. The actual loan contract expires in the end of the season so he would move as a free player .

Sevilla

On 23 July 2019, Gudelj signed with Spanish side Sevilla FC. In July 2020 he tested positive for COVID-19.

International career
After being capped at the U19 and U21 levels, Gudelj earned his first cap for Serbia on 5 March 2014, in a 2–1 away win over Ireland in a friendly match after coming on as a last minute substitute for Antonio Rukavina. In 2014, Gudelj played for the national team a further four times, playing against Jamaica twice, Panama and Brazil.

In July 2014 his former coach at AZ, Dick Advocaat, was named as Serbia's national team manager for the Euro 2016 campaign. He scored his first goal on 18 November 2014 in a 2–0 away friendly win against Greece.

In November 2022, he was selected in Serbia's squad for the 2022 FIFA World Cup in Qatar. He played in group stage matches against Brazil and Switzerland. Serbia finished fourth in the group.

Career statistics

Club

International

Scores and results list Serbia's goal tally first, score column indicates score after each Gudelj goal.

Honours
Guangzhou Evergrande Taobao
Chinese FA Super Cup: 2018

Sporting CP
Taça da Liga: 2018–19
 Taça de Portugal: 2018–19

Sevilla
UEFA Europa League: 2019–20

References

External links
Profile at the Sevilla FC website
 
 
 Voetbal International profile 
 Official Twitter account

1991 births
Living people
Footballers from Belgrade
Serbian footballers
Association football midfielders
Serbia international footballers
Serbia under-21 international footballers
NAC Breda players
AZ Alkmaar players
AFC Ajax players
Tianjin Jinmen Tiger F.C. players
Guangzhou F.C. players
Sporting CP footballers
Sevilla FC players
Eredivisie players
Chinese Super League players
Primeira Liga players
La Liga players
Serbian expatriate footballers
Serbian expatriate sportspeople in China
Serbian expatriate sportspeople in Portugal
Serbian expatriate sportspeople in Spain
Expatriate footballers in the Netherlands
Expatriate footballers in China
Expatriate footballers in Portugal
Expatriate footballers in Spain
UEFA Europa League winning players
2022 FIFA World Cup players